Synanthedon cyanescens is a moth of the family Sesiidae. It is known from the Democratic Republic of the Congo and Zambia.

References

Sesiidae
Insects of the Democratic Republic of the Congo
Moths of Africa
Moths described in 1910